Heat shock-related 70 kDa protein 2 is a protein that in humans is encoded by the HSPA2 gene.

References

Further reading

External links 
 

Heat shock proteins